NCB may refer to:

Banks
 NCB Group, investment bank (now defunct)
 National Central Bank, the central banks of the European System of Central Banks
 Nanyang Commercial Bank
 National Cooperative Bank
 National Commercial Bank (Saudi Arabia)

Government
 Narcotics Control Bureau, the Indian drug enforcement agency
 National Central Bureau, a national organisation unit of Interpol; see 
 National Child Benefit
 National Coal Board
 National Codification Bureau
 Naval Construction Battalions (Abbreviation used for US Navy Seabee Battalions in WWII)

Groups, organizations, companies
 National Cargo Bureau
 National Children's Bureau
 National Coordination Board (Syria)
 National Coordination Body for Democratic Change, a Syrian political bloc
 Nasser Club Bar Elias, a Lebanese association football club
 Nordisk Copyright Bureau, a copyright administration organization based in Denmark
 North Cornwall Broadcasting, formerly BC Radio and now known as NCB Radio in Bodmin, Cornwall
 Northern Coachbuilders, the former name of Smith Electric Vehicles
 Nottingham Concert Band

Other uses
 Nitro cold brew coffee
New Catholic Bible, a Catholic version of the Bible

See also

 
 NBC (disambiguation)
 CNB (disambiguation)
 CBN (disambiguation)
 BNC (disambiguation)
 BCN (disambiguation)